Danville is a city in and the county seat of Vermilion County, Illinois. As of the 2010 census, its population was 33,027. As of 2019, the population was an estimated 30,479.

History

The area that is now Danville was once home to the Miami, Kickapoo, and Potawatomi tribes of Native Americans. The sale of lots was set for April 10, 1827 and advertised in newspapers in Indianapolis, Indiana and the state capital of Vandalia. The first post office was established in May of the same year in the house of Amos Williams, organizer of Vermilion and Edgar Counties and a prominent Danville citizen. Williams and Beckwith drew up the first plat map; the city was named after Dan Beckwith at Williams' suggestion, although Beckwith suggested the names "Williamsburg" and "Williamstown". Beckwith was born in Pennsylvania in 1795 and moved to Indiana as a young man; in 1819 he accompanied the first white explorers to the area where Danville later existed because of his interest in the salt springs of the Vermilion River. He died in 1835 of pneumonia contracted on a horseback ride back from Washington; he was 40 years old.

In 1838 the Potawatomi Trail of Death camped and then passed through Danville. Four Potawatomi people died and were buried in Danville. In the mid-1800s Abraham Lincoln visited Danville over the course of approximately 18 years as he practiced law across the 8th Judicial Circuit. Danville was home to Ward Hill Lamon his law partner who later served as his bodyguard. Lincoln later gave a speech in his stocking feet from the balcony of Dr. William Fithian, a prominent Danville physician. The Fithian home is listed on the National Register of Historic Places and serves as the Vermilion County Museum. In 1882, a small group of Franciscan Sisters formed St. Elizabeth Hospital out of a 14-room hotel. In 1883 a horsecar based streetcar was established. In 1884 an opera house was constructed. In 1891 the streetcar system was converted to electric streetcars.

Danville became a major industrial city in the late 19th and early twentieth centuries. Starting in the 1850s Danville was an important coal mining area; some of the first open pit mining techniques were practiced here. The coal formation underlying eastern Illinois and western Indiana is named the "Danville Member," after the area where it was first discovered. Danville also served as a significant manufacturing center during the early 1900s, and the city's population doubled between 1900 and 1920. During this time Danville also acted as a rail hub for both passenger and freight service. Danville was the site of a riot in 1903, which led to the lynching of a black man and an assault on the county jail.

The Danville Branch of the National Home for Disabled Volunteer Soldiers opened in 1898 and, by 1910, 4,257 veterans were at the branch. This branch was the eighth of ten branches founded by the National Home for Disabled Volunteer Soldiers (NHDVS), nationwide, between 1866 and 1929. The Soldiers' Home was a major center in-itself with its own passenger train service, streetcar line, mess hall, farms, livestock, lake, jail, hospital, bakery, laundry stables, stores, theater, chapel, mortuary, office buildings, power plant, print shop, shoemakers, tinsmiths, barber shop and fire department. The first Danville Public Library was formed out of various existing collections in 1883 and was replaced by a Carnegie library in 1904. In 1910, a group of 9 elephants escaped from a Ringling circus and ran through Danville before being recaptured.

An extension University of Illinois was created in Danville in 1946. The extension became an independent junior college in 1949.  The college, now called Danville Area Community College, acquired several historic buildings from the Veterans Administration which were renovated throughout the 1960s for educational purposes. These acquisitions placed the college on a larger campus shared with the National Cemetery and modernized Veteran's Hospital. In the 1970s the enclosed Village Mall was constructed.

By 1966 only 6 mines remained in Vermilion County. With the closure of the mines and many factories, including a major General Motors plant, Danville's economic base suffered in the latter half of the 20th century and the population began to decline significantly. Many of the former mines were converted into lakes, creating fishing and recreation opportunities at parks such as Kickapoo State Recreation Area and Kennekuk Cove County Park. The 21st century has seen continued population decline but also major economic development initiatives including the restoration of the Fisher Theatre, expansion of major health care facilities, and the expansion of educational programs focused on job placement.

Geography
Illinois Route 1, U.S. Route 136, and U.S. Route 150 intersect in Danville; Interstate 74 passes through the south end of town. Lake Vermilion is located on the northwest side of town.

Climate 

Average monthly precipitation ranged from  inches in February to  inches in June.

Demographics

 
Danville is the principal city of the Danville Metropolitan Statistical Area, which encompasses all of Danville and Vermilion County.

As of the census of 2000, there were 33,904 people, 13,327 households, and 8,156 families residing in the city. The racial makeup of the city was 70.19% White, 24.37% African American, 0.21% Native American, 1.20% Asian, 0.03% Pacific Islander, 2.09% from other races, and 1.92% from two or more races. Hispanic or Latino of any race were 4.57% of the population.

There were 13,327 households, out of which 28% had children under the age of 18 living with them, 42.0% were married couples living together, 15.1% had a female householder with no husband present, and 38.8% were non-families. 33.9% of all households were made up of individuals, and 15.5% had someone living alone who was 65 years of age or older. The average household size was 2.35 and the average family size was 3.01.

In the city, the population was spread out, with 24.9% under the age of 18, 9.5% from 18 to 24, 27.7% from 25 to 44, 21.3% from 45 to 64, and 16.6% who were 65 years of age or older. The median age was 37 years. For every 100 females, there were 99.3 males. For every 100 females age 18 and over, there were 97.7 males.

The median income for a household in the city was $30,431, and the median income for a family was $39,308. Males had a median income of $31,027 versus $22,303 for females. The per capita income for the city was $16,476. 18.1% of the population and 13.4% of families were below the poverty line. Out of the total people living in poverty, 26.8% were under the age of 18 and 10.5% were 65 or older.

In 2014, according to the United States Bureau of Economic Analysis, Danville was the cheapest place to live in the United States.

2019 United States Census Bureau American Community Survey estimates

Parks and recreation
The city of Danville maintains 20+ parks and recreation facilities, from small pocket parks to large regionally significant parklands. Danville's parks contribute to a county-wide collection that includes four county parks and three state parks. When combined with the city parkland, these total more than 15,000 acres, providing more acres of public park per capita than in any other county in Illinois.

Danville sits along the shore of Lake Vermilion, which is a 1,000-acre reservoir. The lake allows for fishing, bird watching, and unlimited-horsepower marine boating, jet-skiing, and waterskiing. Danville also sits along the Vermilion River, which provides recreational opportunities and supports abundant wildlife.

There are several notable parks within the city, including Lincoln Park, home of mature trees, tennis courts, and the Abraham Lincoln–associated Lamon House (a Greek Revival cottage built in 1850 by Joseph and Melissa Beckwith Lamon). On the west side of the city, the North Fork of the Vermilion River winds through Harrison Park Golf Course, providing a backdrop for the 235-acre golf course and hiking destination. On the north side, the Heron County Park Wetlands Boardwalk extends into Lake Vermilion and includes a 950-foot handicapped-accessible floating boardwalk that weaves through the marshland. The park also contains a 30-foot observation tower, which often provides views of bald eagles and American egrets.

The downtown district contains five pocket parks, including Lindley Sign Forest and Temple Plaza. Temple Plaza hosts a number of community events throughout the year; including a summer concert series and a brick relief sculpture created by Texas-based artist Donna Dobberfuhl.

Additional recreational opportunities exist throughout the community, including Fetch Dog Park, the Danville Dans collegiate summer league baseball team, the Vermillion County Bobcats of the SPHL (Southern Professional Hockey League), and many community sports leagues.

Neighborhoods 

Danville is made up of many neighborhoods, of which 14 have or have had official neighborhood associations and 9 have official borders. The West Downtown neighborhood is one of the city's oldest, dating back to the later part of the 19th century. The neighborhood was home of the Renaissance Initiative Program created in 2000, which worked for the restoration and preservation of the neighborhood's historic assets. While the program officially disbanded in 2008, the West Downtown Neighborhood association continues these efforts. The Lincoln Park neighborhood is a locally designated historic district. Within the Lincoln Park neighborhood sits the 22-acre Lincoln Park, home of the also locally designed historic landmark the Lamon House. The Danville Neighborhood Leadership Council works to promote neighborhood associations, improve quality of life, and coordinate with City of Danville departments.

Danville is broadly divided into three districts. including the downtown district, the retail district, and the campus district. The downtown district consists of the historic core of the city, the retail district includes the northside retail corridor, and the campus district includes the Danville Area Community College (DACC) and VA campuses on the city's east side.

Economics
Danville's main shopping center is the Village Mall, opened in 1975. Additional retail has spread north on Route 1/Vermilion Street since the early 90s, ranging from traditional big-box stores to retail infill and redevelopment of abandoned shopping centers. Retail in the community has increased after a large influx of redevelopment and green development, beginning in 2013 with the addition of Meijer and the Kohl's Plaza.

Portions of Danville are covered under the Illinois Enterprise Zone Program tax incentive program. Additionally, the City of Danville has created five Tax Increment Financing districts, including downtown, campus corridor, midtown, east Voorhees, and western gateway. Other available programs include a small business revolving loan fund and a downtown special service area (SSA). Economic development initiatives in the county, including in Danville, are covered by the organization Vermilion Advantage as well as Downtown Danville Inc, the City of Danville, and other partners.

The largest employment sectors in the Danville MSA are government (22.5%), manufacturing (17.8%), and retail (13.1%).

Following the legalization of Cannabis in Illinois, Danville's location on the Indiana state line made it an attractive location for a recreational cannabis dispensary (cannabis remains illegal in Indiana). Cresco Labs opened an adult-use dispensary under the Sunnyside brand in Danville in May 2020.

Culture

Tourism 
Tourism provides a significant economic impact to the Danville area. Danville is rich in Lincoln history, with over 12 sites commemorating his 18 years practicing law there while riding the 8th Judicial Circuit. Danville is a designated Looking for Lincoln gateway community and is home of three Looking for Lincoln wayside exhibits.

Other tourist attractions include the historic downtown district, home of the Fischer Theatre, which includes a museum dedicated to the many famous performers who have lived in Danville, including Dick Van Dyke, Jerry Van Dyke, Donald O'Connor, Bobby Short, and Helen Morgan. The downtown area also includes the performance space Temple Plaza, Palmer Arena and ice rink, and 18 murals painted in 4 days by 160 Walldog artists from all over the world.

Danville is home to a number of noteworthy buildings and structures, including 10 places on the National Register of Historic Places and 21 places on the local registry. These notable places include a Carnegie library, now operating as the Vermilion County War Museum; the Fithian Home, where Abraham Lincoln gave a speech in 1858; and the Danville Branch, National Home for Disabled Volunteer Soldiers Historic District, currently located on the campus of DACC; the VA; and the Danville National Cemetery.

Events and festivals 

In July the city attracts hot air balloon enthusiasts from around the region for Balloons Over Vermilion, which takes place at the Vermilion Regional Airport, and a Splash-n-Dash flight over Lake Vermilion. In June regional artists descend on Danville for the annual Arts in the Park event in the historic Lincoln Park. Throughout the summer downtown's Temple Plaza hosts the Summer Sounds Concert Series. The area is home to many other events throughout the year, including parades, farmers' markets, sporting events, and festivals.

Cultural institutions 
Danville is home to several significant cultural institutions and museums. Artistic institutions include the Danville Art League, headquartered in the west downtown neighborhood; the Danville Symphony Orchestra; the Danville Light Opera; the Dark Horse Theater Company; the Red Mask Players; and the DACC Players (from the Danville Area Community College. Performance venues include the historic Fischer Theatre, the Kathryn Randolph Theater, and the performance venues on DACC's campus. Museums in the city include the Vermilion County Museum, the Vermilion County War Museum, and the Fischer Arts & Entertainment Museum.

Sports 
Outside of high school and Danville Area Community College sports, Danville is home to two sports teams. The Danville Dans are a summer collegiate wooden-bat baseball team that play in Danville Stadium. They were founded in 1989 as a member of the Central Illinois Collegiate League, which later merged with the Prospect League. The team has won nine championships, all of them coming in the CICL. The Danville Dashers of the Federal Prospects Hockey League played at the David S. Palmer Arena from 2011 to 2020 and were named after the original tenants, the Danville Dashers. In 2021, the arena voted to replace the Dashers with a new team in the Southern Professional Hockey League called the Vermilion County Bobcats.

Government

Recent mayors
1967–1971: Al Gardner
1971–1975: Rolland E. Craig  	
1975–1985: David S. Palmer, namesake of David S. Palmer Arena
1985: Wilbur Scharlau, appointed acting mayor by city council following Palmer's death
1985–1986: Hardin W. Hawes, appointed acting mayor following Scharlau's resignation
1986–1987: Wilbur Scharlau, appointed mayor following resignation of Hawes
1987–2003: Robert E. Jones, namesake of Danville Municipal building
2003–2018: Scott Eisenhauer, namesake of Danville Public Works Building
2018–present: Rickey Williams Jr., appointed Acting Mayor by the city council, following Eisenhauer's resignation. Elected to full term on April 2, 2019. Defeated Former Vermilion County Board Chairman James McMahon, Alderman Steve Nichols, and Donald Crews.
The City of Danville website maintains the complete list of mayors from 1867 to present.

Education

Colleges
 Danville Area Community College
 Lakeview College of Nursing

Primary and secondary education
High schools
 Danville High School
 Schlarman Academy
 First Baptist Christian School
 Danville Christian Academy
 Danville New Tech High                       
 Kenneth D. Bailey Academy

Middle schools
 Danville Lutheran School
 Schlarman Academy
 North Ridge Middle School
 First Baptist Christian School

Elementary schools
 Schlarman Academy
 Danville Lutheran School
 First Baptist Christian School
 Cannon (demolished 2022)
 Edison 
 Garfield
 Liberty
 Mark Denman (formerly known as East Park)
 Meade Park
 Northeast
 South View Upper Elementary (5th and 6th Grade, formerly known as South View Middle School)
 Southwest

Transportation
The general aviation community is served by the Vermilion Regional Airport.

Danville is known as a major railroad intersection with at least four different tracks entering town from different directions, resulting in many crossings throughout the town. CSX Transportation, Norfolk Southern Railway, and Kankakee, Beaverville and Southern Railroad all operate rail lines that pass through Danville.

Danville Mass Transit (DMT) operates 14 fixed route buses in Danville and surrounding areas.

Notable people

See also
 List of photographs of Abraham Lincoln

References

External links

City of Danville
Commercial News, local newspaper
Danville School District 118
"History of Vermilion County Illinois" book

 
Cities in Vermilion County, Illinois
Cities in Illinois
County seats in Illinois
Populated places established in 1827
Metropolitan areas of Illinois
1827 establishments in Illinois